Kilbricken, officially Kilbrickan, is a hamlet in County Laois, Ireland, on the Dublin-Cork railway line.

Mountrath & Castletown railway station opened at Kilbricken on 1 September 1848. It was part of the Great Southern and Western Railway in Ireland and was used for 127 years before being closed for goods traffic on 3 November 1975 and finally closed altogether by the CIÉ on 6 September 1976. The station is no longer served and the station buildings are now privately owned. Although derelict, the stone built station can still be seen standing along this track.

Notable people
Victoria Cross winner James Bergin was from Kilbricken.

See also
 List of towns and villages in Ireland

References

Towns and villages in County Laois